The Egypt–Sudan border is 1,276 km (793 mi) in length and runs from the tripoint with Libya in the west to the Red Sea in the east. The eastern section of the border is subject to a territorial dispute between the two states.

Description
The border starts in the west at the tripoint with Libya on Gabal El Uweinat and then proceeds eastwards along the 22nd parallel north to Lake Nasser. The border then briefly veers northwards, creating an area known as the 'Wadi Halfa Salient', before resuming its course along the 22nd parallel out to the Red Sea just south of Cape Elba (Ras Hadarba). Sudan maintains that the border diverges about 183 km (114 mi) east of the salient, shifting south so as to leave Bir Tawil in Egypt, and then north-east so as to include the Halaib Triangle within Sudan. The boundary traverses a thinly populated region of the Sahara desert and Libyan desert known traditionally as Nubia, with the main population centres being around the river Nile in the vicinity of Wadi Halfa.

History

Egypt, though nominally part of the Ottoman Empire, had acquired a large degree of autonomy under Muhammad Ali following the Second Egyptian-Ottoman War of 1839–41. In 1882 the British occupied Egypt, effectively establishing a protectorate (formally declared only in 1914). Egypt's traditional claim to Sudan was maintained, and following a war against Mahdist forces in 1890s, the British conquered Sudan and created Anglo-Egyptian Sudan in January 1899 as a condominium state, divided from Egypt along the 22nd parallel. The Wadi Halfa salient was added to Sudan on 26 March 1899 in order place a rail terminus from Khartoum under Sudanese control. A further agreement of 1902 created an 'administrative boundary' in the east in order to facilitate the administration of various nomadic peoples, thereby creating the Bir Tawil region (to Egypt) and the Halayib triangle (to Anglo-Egyptian Sudan).

Egypt gained full independence in 1922, and in 1956 the Anglo-Egyptian condominium was terminated with Sudan becoming independent. At that point the 1902 agreement remained in force, however in 1958 Egypt re-asserted the 1899 boundary, a move protested by Sudan. After a brief show of force Egyptian forces withdrew from the region, and the dispute thereafter lay dormant. In 1959 Egypt and Sudan signed a treaty which paved the way for Egypt to create the Aswan Dam, which had the knock-on effect of flooding much of the Wadi Halfa salient under Lake Nasser.

The Halayib dispute flared up again in 1992 when it looked as if oil might be discovered off its coast. Egypt moved troops into the area, effectively establishing Egyptian control, despite the protestations of Sudan. Thereafter, then Sudanese President Omar al-Bashir reiterated the Sudanese claim of sovereignty over Halayib in a 2010 speech in Port Sudan, saying "Halayeb is Sudanese and will always be Sudanese." At present the 1899 border is de facto in effect, leaving Bir Tawil in the unique position of being the only non-polar piece of land not claimed by any country on earth.

Settlements near the border

Egypt
 Shalateen (disputed)

Sudan
 Faras (historic)
 Wadi Halfa
 Selima Oasis

See also
 Nubians 
 Roman Egypt 
 Egypt–Sudan relations
 Roman relations with Nubia 
 Darb El Arba'īn, historic trade route traversing the area

References

 
Borders of Egypt
Borders of Sudan
International borders